Chief Tahachee (born Jeff Davis "Tahchee" Cypert, March 4, 1904 – June 9, 1978) was a writer, a stage actor, a film extra, and a vaudeville performer. He claimed to be a descendant of the Old Settler Cherokees.

Chief Tahachee wrote four books: Poems of Dreams (1942), Drifting Sands (1950), An American Indian Climb Toward Truth & Wisdom (1955), and The Rough and Rowdy Ways of an American Indian Cowboy (1957). Poems of Dreams was his most popular and he renewed the copyright on it October 1972.

Chief Tahachee was an actor, stuntman and film extra in many Hollywood films produced from the 1920s to the 1960s, including westerns, film noir, drama, and historical sagas. His first film appearance was in a silent film, The Last of the Mohicans, in 1920 at the age of 16.

Tahachee was married to poet and Hollywood film extra Dorothy Lear Evelyn Teters Cypert "Nawana" Yarbrough, who also went by "Princess Neowana." After their divorce married six more times, he fathered ten children. He died June 9, 1978, in San Gabriel, California of a heart attack.

References

External links

American male actors
American writers
1904 births
1978 deaths
People from Crittenden County, Arkansas
Male actors from Arkansas
Vaudeville performers
American people of Cherokee descent
20th-century American male actors
20th-century American singers